Longèves may refer to the following places in France:
 Longèves, Charente-Maritime
 Longèves, Vendée